Kanuni University was a higher education institution in the city of Adana. The university was founded in 2013 by the Çukurova Education and Culture Foundation.

Academics

Faculties
Faculty of Management and Economics
Faculty of Engineering
Faculty of Human Sciences

Institutes
Social Sciences Institute
Natural Sciences Institute

References

External links

Universities and colleges in Turkey
Education in Adana
Educational institutions established in 2013
2013 establishments in Turkey
Defunct universities and colleges in Turkey